Shtar Academy is the self-titled debut studio album by French hip hop collective Shtar Academy, consisting of rappers Badri, Malik and Mirak. It was released on 20 January 2014 by Fu-Jo, and distributed by Because Music, and peaked at number 63 on the French Albums Chart.

Background
Shtar Academy was started as a musical project in 2012 by record producer Mouloud Mansouri, who had previously served a jail sentence between 1999 and 2008 for drug trafficking. He had the idea for his project approved by the administration of the Luynes Prison. The prison administration also approved the construction of the Studio Hip Hop Convict, where the album was recorded, within the prison compounds, but reserved the right to censor any proposed texts by the prisoners that were deemed excessively violent or aggressive towards prison wardens, or presenting menacing lyrics addressed to judges, the police or to victims of crimes.

Prisoners detained for a year or more in Luynes were eligible to showcase their potential talents. More than 200 prisoners, almost the entire population of the prison, were briefed on the project, and initially around 30 of them expressed an interest and signed up for the project. Through interviews and assessments, and test performances conducted by Mansouri and co-producer Tony Danza, the number of eligible applicants was reduced to a dozen and eventually three of the most talented were chosen through a competitive elimination process to spearhead the musical project. Badri received a sentence of seven years, while Malik and Mirak were sentenced to three and four years imprisonment respectively. For a whole year, the three worked regularly on various workshops for songwriting, composition, and training for recordings and computer-assisted production. More than 30 well-known French rappers and producers volunteered their time supporting the project through mentoring and coaching. They also provided studio time and agreed to be featured in compositions by the prisoners, which were presented during a three-hour live show on 3 June 2013.

Single
"Les portes du pénitencier" was released as the album's lead single on 11 December 2013, but did not enter the French Singles Chart.

Music videos
A number of music videos for a number of the album's songs were released before and after the release of the album.
 A live performance of "Passez-moi le micro" was released on 28 August 2013, and doubles up as the song's official music video.
The music video for "Wesh les taulards" was released on 21 November 2013. Directed by Sarah Marx, the video was shot in an abandoned building in the absence of the members of Shtar Academy, as they were still incarcerated at the time. Several actors take the place of the three rappers.
 The official music video for "Primaire", featuring Lino, was released on 29 November 2013. It is primarily a lyric video, where the lyrics of the song appear as they are performed, along with other various illustrations in line with the song's lyrics.
 Two music videos were released for the regular (short) and long versions of "Les portes du pénitencier". They were both directed by Sarah Marx. The videos follow Mouloud Mansouri, who plays a prison inmate, as he lives through his sentence at the Hauts-de-Seine Prison and is finally released at the end of the video.
 The regular version's music video was released on 11 December 2013, as part of the single's release. It features appearances by Mirak, Nekfeu, Nemir, Alonzo and Soprano as they perform their verses of the song.
 Released on 3 January 2014, the music video for the long version of the song features an introduction to the story of Mansouri's life in prison, where the narrator also briefly speaks of Mansouri's life after prison and the formation of Shtar Academy. The rest of the artists featured in the song, except Keny Arkana, also make appearances in the video as they perform their verses of the song, including Orelsan and Gringe, who perform their verse together as the Casseurs Flowters.
 The music video for "Ça fait un bail", featuring Tunisiano, was released on 7 February 2014. It was shot at a prison, where Tunisiano plays an inmate being visited by his friend, Mirak, and features scenes where the two rap their bits of the song at a table as if they were having a conversation.

Track listing
All songs produced by Mouloud Mansouri and Tony Danza.

Credits
Credits for Shtar Academy adapted from Discogs.

Personnel

 Ali – Featured artist
 Alonzo – Featured artist
 Badri – Primary artist
 Bakar – Featured artist
 Blastar – Composition
 Cannibal Smith – Composition
 Disiz – Featured artist
 DJ R-Ash – Featured artist
 Doom Bada – Mixing
 Etienne M. – Mixing (assistant)
 Gringe – Featured artist
 Hits Alive – Composition
 Keny Arkana – Featured artist
 La Fouine – Featured artist
 Ladéa – Featured artist
 Leck – Featured artist
 Lino – Featured artist
 Malik – Primary artist
 Mirak – Primary artist
 Medeline – Composition
 Médine – Featured artist
 Mister You – Featured artist
 Mouloud Mansouri – Producer, composition
 Nekfeu – Featured artist
 Némir – Featured artist
 Niro – Featured artist
 Fred Nlandu – Mixing
 Nor – Featured artist
 Mitch Olivier – Mixing
 Nadir Photographie – Photography
 Orelsan – Featured artist
 Ovaground Prod – Composition
 Proof – Composition
 REDK – Featured artist
 Roro – Composition
 S-Pi – Featured artist
 Sat – Featured artist
 Skalpovich – Composition, mixing
 Soopa – Composition
 Soprano – Featured artist
 Street Scientist Beat – Composition
 Tékila – Featured artist
 Tony Danza – Producer, composition
 Tunisiano – Featured artist
 Vincenzo – Featured artist

Studios
 BPM Studio – Mixing
 Masterdisk Europe – Mastering
 Studio Hip Hop Convict – Recording
 Studio Davout – Mixing
 Studio Kilomaître Foundation – Mixing
 Studio Fabrik48 – Mixing

Chart performance

References

2014 debut albums
Shtar Academy albums
Collaborative albums
French-language albums